Nicholas III may refer to:

 Patriarch Nicholas III of Constantinople (died 1111), ruled 1084–1111
 Pope Nicholas III (c. 1225–1280), ruled 1277–1280
 Nicholas III, Lord of Mecklenburg (after 1230–1289 or 1290)
 Nicholas III of Saint Omer (died 1314)
 Nicholas III, Duke of Opava (c. 1339–1394)
 Patriarch Nicholas III of Alexandria, ruled 1389–1398
 Prince Karl Emich of Leiningen (born 1952), pretender to the Russian throne as Nicholas III

See also

 Nicholas (disambiguation)
 Niccolò III (disambiguation)
 Nikola III (disambiguation)